Anxo Lorenzo is a musician who plays the gaita, the traditional Galician bagpipe, from Moaña (Tirán), a small village on the Atlantic Coast of Galicia (Spain).

Lorenzo has played on several festivals, including Piping Live!, the William Kennedy Piping Festival and Féile Iorrais in Northern Ireland .

Discography
2001: Spíritu (986)
2010: Tirán

References

External links
 Official Site

1974 births
Musicians from Galicia (Spain)
Players of Galician bagpipes
Living people
People from Moaña